Hendrikus "Hennie" Zacharias Keetelaar (23 January 1927 – 28 January 2002) was a Dutch water polo competitor. He played two matches at the 1948 Summer Olympics where his team won a bronze medal. He won a European title two years later.

See also
 List of Olympic medalists in water polo (men)

References

External links
 

1927 births
2002 deaths
Dutch male water polo players
Olympic bronze medalists for the Netherlands in water polo
Water polo players at the 1948 Summer Olympics
Medalists at the 1948 Summer Olympics
Sportspeople from Hilversum
20th-century Dutch people